Hugo Arellano (born March 5, 1998) is an American soccer player who most recently played for LA Galaxy in Major League Soccer.

Career 
Arellano began playing with LA Galaxy II during their 2016 season after a stint with their academy.

Arellano made his professional first team debut for the LA Galaxy on June 17, 2017.

International career
Born in the United States to Mexican parents, Arellano is a youth international for the United States.

References

External links 
 USMNT Profile
 

1998 births
Living people
American soccer players
American sportspeople of Mexican descent
LA Galaxy II players
LA Galaxy players
Orange County SC players
Association football defenders
People from Norwalk, California
Soccer players from California
USL Championship players
United States men's youth international soccer players
United States men's under-20 international soccer players
Major League Soccer players
Homegrown Players (MLS)